Anthony or Tony Clarke may refer to:

Tony Clarke (British politician) (born 1963), English Labour Party politician, MP for Northampton South from 1997 to 2005
Anthony Clarke (judoka) (born 1961), Australian athlete
Tony Clarke (activist) (born 1944), Canadian political activist
Anthony Clarke, Baron Clarke of Stone-cum-Ebony (born 1943), English judge
Tony Clarke (singer) (1940–1971), American soul singer
Tony Clarke (record producer) (1941–2010), English music producer
Tony Clarke (sport shooter) (born 1959), New Zealand sports shooter
Anthony Clarke, Baron Clarke of Hampstead or Tony Clarke (born 1932), British trade unionist and Labour peer
Anthony Clarke (businessman) (born 1953), British chartered accountant and businessman
Anthony John Clarke, Irish-born singer-songwriter
Anto Clarke (born 1944), Irish judoka

See also
Anthony Clark (disambiguation)
Anthony Clarke Booth (1846–1899), English recipient of the Victoria Cross